This page lists the World Best Year Performances in the year 1986 in the Men's hammer throw. One of the main events during this season were the 1986 European Athletics Championships in Stuttgart, West Germany, where the final of the men's competition was held on August 30, 1986. The women did not compete in the hammer throw until the early 1990s. Soviet Union's Yuriy Sedykh broke his own world record twice during the 1986 season.

Records

1986 World Year Ranking

References
digilander.libero
apulanta
hammerthrow.wz

1986
Hammer Throw Year Ranking, 1986